The BELEX15 index is the blue chip index of the Belgrade Stock Exchange (BELEX). 

The index compromises the 15 largest and most liquid stocks traded on the exchange. The index was initially established in September 2005. The newest methodology of calculating it was published in August 2012 and represents a correction in the sense of adjusting this index to characteristics of indexes on developed markets.

Composition
List of the BELEX15 constituents as of 5 January 2023.

References

External links
 BELEX15 daily standing

Economy of Serbia
European stock market indices